Çamtepe is a village in Tarsus district of Mersin Province, Turkey. It is situated in Çukurova (Cilicia of the antiquity) to the northeast of Tarsus and between Turkish motorway  and Turkish state highway . The population of Çamtepe was 292 as of 2011.

References

Villages in Tarsus District